Ewout Genemans (born 7 february 1985 in The Hague) is a Dutch tv producer, presenter, moderator and keynote speaker. He is well-known for presenting various tv programmes at RTL and produces popular shows with his production company No Pictures Please.

Biography

Genemans attended the St.-Maartenscollege in Voorburg and joined the Rabarber Youth theatre school in The Hague afterwards. After obtaining his havo-diploma, he studied at the School of Journalism in Utrecht for six months. He worked as an editorial assistant at Visible TV next to his studies and got to be part of the RTL4 show ‘Vliegende Hollanders’ in this way. He worked on the production of the tv show ‘Meiden van De Wit’ in 2003. Genemans was an actor in the teen show ZOOP on Nickelodeon and the corresponding films Zoop in Afrika, Zoop in India and Zoop in Zuid-Amerika. After singing the songs ‘Laat me leven’ and ‘Verliefd’ on the show, Ewout got requested to sing at festivals as well. 

Genemans worked at castingbureau Kemna Casting for a year after his work for ZOOP. He presented the show ‘Willem Wever’ for NCRV in 2007 and participated in ‘Dancing on Ice’. He became the permanent replacement for Pepijn Gunneweg at the ‘BZT Show’ and presented the tv show ‘Sudokidz’ in 2008 as well. 

Ewout did the voice over for Remy, the main character in Disney/Pixar’s animated movie Ratatouille. He also became a popular voice for commercials such as ‘Veilig Verkeer Nederland’ and ‘Postbank’. 

Genemans additionally founded the production company ‘No Pictures Please' together with Jon Karthaus. They worked side by side until 2011, when Karthaus decided to focus on his career as a singer-songwriter. They came up with the concept for the tv show ‘Fans!’ that was broadcast on SBS6. From 2010 onwards, Genemans became the presenter of the Junior Songfestival (for AVRO) that had previously been presented by Sipke Jan Bousema. He also became the presenter of ‘Wie wordt Kruimeltje?’ and AvaStars starting from May that year. 

Ewout played the role of Davis for the ‘Hart onder de riem’ episode of S1NGLE on the 30th of March in 2010. He debuted as a presenter on the national broadcaster ‘Nederland 1’ for the AVRO-show ‘Onder Wibi’s Vleugels’. He covered the ‘Gouden Televizier-Ring Gala’ at the ‘Voetbal International’ studio for AVRO as well. He signed an exclusive contract with AVRO on the 1st of December 2011. He organised the AVRO international finale of the Junior Eurovisiesongfestival 2012 and presented it together with Kim-Lian van der Meij. On the 14th of April 2012, he participated in the newest season of the SBS6-show ‘Fans!’. He also participated in the thirteenth season of ‘Wie is de Mol?’, but had to leave after the first episode. 2013 was the year in which he presented the Junior Songfestival for the last time. 

Between 2012 and 2016, Genemans mainly produced shows for RTL 5 such as ‘Ik heb HET nog nooit gedaan’, ‘From Russia with Love’ or ‘Voetbalfans’ for RTL 7. He also presented the show ‘5 Extreem’ for RTL 5. He did a comeback of ‘Fans!’ in 2015 called ‘Superfans: Mijn idool is mijn leven.’ Starting from the 1st of October 2015, ‘No Pictures Please’ became part of FremantleMedia. Ewout stepped down as a Managing Director in 2020 and took on the role as a Creative Lead at FremantleMedia. 

Genemans has been a presenter and tv producer at RTL Nederland since 2017. He presented various shows for both RTL 4 and RTL 5. Ewout presented ‘Verslaafd’ since 2019 and permanently replaced Peter van der Vorst as a presenter for the show in 2021. 

Ewout released a documentary on the 27th of December in 2021 called ‘Staand verder leven: na de moord op Peter R. de Vries’ after the murder of crime reporter Peter R. de Vries that was broadcast on RTL 4.

TV Producer
2008–2009 – several items Nickelodeon and MTV
2009 – various promos Nederland 3/Z@PP
2009–2010 – Fans! SBS 6
2010 – Heibel langs de lijn KRO
2011 – Voetbalfans RTL 7
2011 – De Gilfactor EO
2013 – Echte Penoze RTL 4
2014 – From Russia with Love RTL 5

Presenter & Actor 
2003 – Vrienden zonder grenzen Teleac/NOT (actor)
2004–2007 – Zoop (TV) Nickelodeon (actor)
2007–present – Willem Wever NCRV (presenter)
2007–2008 – Sudokidz NCRV (presenter)
2007–present – BZT-Show NCRV (presenter)
2009 – Museumbende AVRO (presenter)
2009–present – Kinderprinsengrachtconcert AVRO (presenter)
2009–present – AvaStars LIVE AVRO (presenter)
2010 – S1NGLE NET 5 (guest)
2010 – Wie wordt Kruimeltje? AVRO (presenter)
2010–present – Junior Songfestival AVRO (presenter)
2010 – Junior Sintfestival AVRO (presenter)
2011 – Zapp live NCRV/Nederland 3 (presenter)
2011 – Amsterdam Gay Pride AVRO/Nederland 3 (presenter)
2011 – Onder Wibi's Vleugels AVRO/Nederland 1 (presenter)
2011 – Gouden televizierringgala AVRO/Nederland 1
2014 – 5 Extreem RTL 5 (presenter)
2017 – Beruchte gevangenissen: Ewout in de cel RTL 5 (presenter)

Filmography

Film
2005 – Zoop in Africa
2006 – Zoop in India
2007 – Zoop in South America
2007 Ratatouille (film) - Remy
2007 Je vriend de rat - Remy
2008 Chasseurs de dragons (film) - Hector

Television 

2005 Gemma Glitter (Winnaar Roltrap Rentest) – AVRO
2007 Sterren Dansen op het IJs – SBS6
2009 Te leuk om waar te zijn – TROS
2009 Hole in the wall – SBS6
2009 Let's Dance – RTL 4
2009 Uri Geller (Finale) – SBS6
2010 De leukste jaren – KRO
2010 Life 4 you – RTL 4
2011 Koffietijd – RTL 4
2011 De Wereld Draait Door – VARA
2012 Z@PP Your Planet – Z@pp
2012 Ik kom bij je eten – RTL 4
2013 Wie is de Mol? – afvaller 1 - AVRO
2017 Beruchte gevangenissen – RTL 5

Discography
"Verliefd"
"Ooh Ooh het voelt zo goed"
"Laat me leven"
"Djeo Ma Djula" (Zoop in Africa)
"India you're like magic to me" (Zoop in India)
"Baila Mi Tango" (Zoop in South America)

References

External links
No Pictures Please

21st-century Dutch male actors
Mass media people from The Hague
Living people
1985 births
Dutch television presenters
Dutch male film actors
Dutch male television actors
21st-century Dutch male singers
21st-century Dutch singers
Male actors from The Hague